Dominic Iorfa may refer to:

Dominic Iorfa (footballer, born 1968), Nigerian footballer
Dominic Iorfa (footballer, born 1995), English footballer